The Current and the Gazette Newspapers is a chain of 15 weekly community newspapers in Cape May and Atlantic counties of New Jersey. It was owned by Catamaran Media, a partnership of the Travers family and The Press of Atlantic City. In 2014, Press owner BH Media acquired full ownership of the chain.

Newspapers
 The Current of Somers Point, Linwood, Northfield
 The Current of Galloway Township and Port Republic
 The Current of Egg Harbor Township
 The Current of Absecon & Pleasantville
 The Current of Mays Landing & Hamilton
 The Current of Downbeach
 The Gazette of Ocean City
 The Leader of Wildwood
 The Gazette of Cape May
 The Gazette of Upper Township
 The Gazette of Middle Township
 The Beachcomber of Brigantine

Seasonal Summer publications
 Free Time
 Sandpaper

References

External links
Official website of The Current and Gazette newspapers of New Jersey

Atlantic County, New Jersey
Cape May County, New Jersey
Newspapers published in New Jersey
Weekly newspapers published in the United States